Dorothy Jane Armstrong is a Canadian former diplomat. Armstrong was the Ambassador Extraordinary and Plenipotentiary to Hungary from 1978 to 1982 and then to Denmark from 1986 to 1991.

External links
 Foreign Affairs and International Trade Canada Complete List of Posts

References

Ambassadors of Canada to Hungary
Year of birth missing (living people)
Living people
Ambassadors of Canada to Denmark
Canadian women ambassadors